Liabum is a genus of South American flowering plants in tribe Liabeae of the family Asteraceae.

Species accepted by the Plants of the World Online as of December 2022:

References

External links
 
 

 
Asteraceae genera
Flora of South America
Taxa named by Michel Adanson
Taxonomy articles created by Polbot